Thomas Rocco Barbella (January 1, 1919 – May 22, 1990), better known as Rocky Graziano, was an American professional boxer and actor who held the World Middleweight title. Graziano is considered one of the greatest knockout artists in boxing history, often displaying the capacity to take his opponent out with a single punch. He was ranked 23rd on The Ring magazine list of the greatest punchers of all time. He fought many of the best middleweights of the era including Sugar Ray Robinson. His turbulent and violent life story was the basis of the 1956 Oscar-winning drama film, Somebody Up There Likes Me, based on his 1955 autobiography of the same title.

Early life
Graziano was the son of Ida Scinto and Nicola Barbella. The elder Barbella, nicknamed Fighting Nick Bob, was a boxer with a brief fighting record. Born in Brooklyn, Rocky later moved to an Italian enclave centered on East 10th Street, between First Avenue and Avenue A in Manhattan's East Village. He grew up as a street fighter and learned to look after himself before he could read or write. He spent years in reform school, jail, and Catholic protectories. Barbella, sr., who got occasional work as a horseback rider, kept boxing gloves around the house and encouraged Rocky and his brothers to fight one another. When he was three years old, Barbella would make Rocky and his brother, Joe (three years his senior), fight almost every night. At age 18 Rocky won the Metropolitan A.A.U. welterweight championship. Despite the fame and money that professional fighting seemed to offer, Rocky didn't want to become a serious prize fighter. He didn't like the discipline of training any more than he liked the discipline of school or the Army.

Amateur career
Graziano heard from a couple of his friends about a tournament going on with a gold medal for the winner. He fought four matches and ended up winning the New York Metropolitan Amateur Athletic Union Boxing Competition (1939). He sold the gold medal for $15 and decided that boxing was a good way to make cash.

In 1940, just weeks into his amateur fighting career, Graziano was arrested for stealing from a school. He went to Coxsackie Correctional Facility, where he spent three weeks, with boyhood friend Jake LaMotta, and then he went on to the New York City Reformatory where he spent five months. After he got out of the reformatory, he headed back to the gym to earn money and while there, met Eddie Cocco who started his professional career. He entered the ring under the name Robert Barber. A couple of weeks later, Graziano was charged with a probation violation and sent back to reform school where he was charged with starting a minor riot. He was then sent to Rikers Island.

When Graziano got out of jail he enlisted in the military but went AWOL after punching a captain. He escaped from Fort Dix in New Jersey and started his real boxing career under the name of "Rocky Graziano". He won his first couple of bouts. After gaining popularity under the name of Graziano, he was found by the military. After his fourth bout, he was called into manager's office to speak with a couple of military personnel. Expecting to be prosecuted and sent back to the military or jail, he fled. He returned to the military a week later. In 1941, he turned himself in, was court-martialed and dishonorably discharged from the Army then sent to The federal penitentiary (nicknamed the “Big Top” for its dome), founded in 1875 as a military prison ( Now known as USP Leavenworth), is located at Fort Leavenworth is where "Rocky" Graziano started his boxing career while housed at the FCP (Minimum/Low)building adjacent to the main facility.  

Ultimately he was pardoned and given the opportunity to fight under the army's aegis.

Professional career
As he grew older and seeing no other way to raise his standard of living, Graziano signed a few boxing contracts, but the rigors of training disinterested him. He and his early managers went their separate ways but eventually, he was picked up by Irving Cohen, who had the sense to give him a long leash. Cohen changed the young fighter's name from Barbella to Graziano (his grandfather's surname) and lined up a fight. Refusing to train much, Graziano nevertheless showed his killer instinct and won by a knockout. Other fights were lined up with Cohen trying, in his subtle way, to overmatch Graziano, get him defeated, and thereby show him the value of getting into condition. He even demanded a match against Sugar Ray Robinson.

In March 1945 at Madison Square Garden in New York City Graziano scored a major upset over Billy Arnold, whose style was similar to that of Sugar Ray Robinson: he was a slick boxer with lightning-fast combinations and a knockout punch. The Ring magazine and various newspapers across the United States touted Arnold as the next Joe Louis or Sugar Ray Robinson. Arnold was a heavy favorite to defeat Graziano and to then fight for the world title. Graziano absorbed a beating in the early going, before going on to batter and knock Arnold out in the third round of the scheduled eight-round bout. Following his loss to Graziano, Arnold was never the same.

Graziano fought three middleweight title bouts against Tony Zale, losing the first before capturing then surrendering the championship. 

In their first match (September 27, 1946), after flooring Graziano in the first round, Zale took a savage beating from him and was on the verge of losing the fight by TKO. However, Zale rallied and knocked him out in the sixth round to retain his title. 

The rematch, a year later in Chicago (July 16, 1947), was a mirror image of their first fight. The referee almost stopped the second fight in the third round because of a severe cut over Graziano's left eye, but Graziano's cutman, Morris ("Whitey") Bimstein, was able to stop the bleeding. Battered around the ring, his eye closed and appearing ready to lose by a knockout, Graziano rallied to knock Zale out in the sixth, earning the title. 

Their last fight was held in New Jersey June 10, 1948. Zale regained his crown, winning the match by a knockout in the third round. The knockout blows consisted of a perfect combination of a right to Graziano's body, then a left hook to his jaw, knocking him unconscious.

Graziano's last shot at the middleweight title came against Sugar Ray Robinson in April 1952. He dropped Robinson to his knee with a right in the third round. Less than a minute later, Robinson KO'd him with a right to the jaw. 

Graziano retired after losing his very next fight, a 10-round decision to Chuck Davey.

Suspensions
In 1946, Graziano was suspended by the New York State Athletic Commission (NYSAC) for failure to report a bribe attempt. In 1948 Graziano was suspended for "running out" on a scheduled December 1 bout with [Ruben Shank]. Abe Green, then-National Boxing Association's President, announced that they were indefinitely suspending him in all parts of the world under NBA supervision, following similar action by the California State Athletic Commission.  The suspension covered all of the American States, Great Britain, the European Boxing Federation, Cuba, Mexico, and Canada. Boxing promoter Ralph Tribuani got him a license to box in Delaware, which led to his reinstatement by both the NBA and NYSAC and Rocky's return the ring.

Post-boxing career
After his retirement from boxing, Graziano cohosted a short-lived series, The Henny and Rocky Show (1955) with famous comedian Henny Youngman. He was a semi-regular on The Martha Raye Show, as Raye's boyfriend. He appeared as a regular on the United Artists TV series Miami Undercover for its entire run, and appeared in several series and shows, including The Pat Boone Chevy Showroom, Car 54, Where Are You?, I've Got a Secret, and Naked City. He portrayed Packy, an ex-boxer, in the 1967 film Tony Rome.

In the 1960s, Graziano opened a pizza restaurant, Rocky Graziano's Pizza Ring, on Second Avenue in Kips Bay, Manhattan, creating a modest franchise for the restaurant in the New York City area. He briefly operated a bowling alley in North Babylon, New York.

Personal life
Graziano married Norma Unger of German-Jewish descent, on August 10, 1943. By all accounts, the two had a very happy marriage, and they remained together until his death from cardiopulmonary failure on May 22, 1990 in New York City at age 71. According to his biographer, Graziano remained faithful to his wife during the entirety of their marriage, something which was not particularly common among celebrities. They had two children, both of whom married and had children. Graziano's funeral was held at St. Patrick's Cathedral. He is interred at the Locust Valley Cemetery along with his wife, who died in 2009.

Legacy
 Graziano is a member of the International Boxing Hall of Fame.
 Graziano was named to Ring magazine's 100 Greatest Punchers of all time.
 In 2007, Graziano was inducted into the Nassau County Sports Hall of Fame.

Professional boxing record

See also
List of middleweight boxing champions

Notes

External links
 
 
 
 Rocky Graziano profile at ESPN 
 
 
 
 

1919 births
1990 deaths
American people of Italian descent
Burials at Locust Valley Cemetery
Deaths from respiratory failure
International Boxing Hall of Fame inductees
Middleweight boxers
People from the Lower East Side
Sportspeople from Brooklyn
Recipients of American presidential pardons
American male boxers
Boxers from New York City
